On the Up is a British situation comedy written by Bob Larbey, about the failure of a millionaire's marriage, and his relationship with his assorted live-in staff. The programme was first broadcast on BBC1 between 4 September 1990 and 2 November 1992.

Plot summary
Tony Carpenter is a self-made millionaire who turned his South London minicab firm into a successful chauffeur-driven car service. He lives in a large detached mansion in Esher, surrounded by Rolls Royces and BMWs, with a domestic staff who respect him, and whom he adores; Witty and insolent butler/driver Sam (who is also a childhood friend of Tony), acerbic secretary Maggie and cook Mrs Wembley (responsible for the series' catch-phrase of "Just the one", used to respond to the offer of a sherry even if it was her third or fourth).

Despite all these advantages, Tony's life is full of conflict:

 His working-class background and sensibilities make him uncomfortable with the idea of having domestic staff, and in dealing with local snobs.
 Nothing he does seems to please his snooty wife Ruth, who hates his downmarket behaviour, constantly suspects him of infidelity with either his secretary Maggie or friend & model Dawn (both of whom are significantly younger than herself), and cannot abide the "chummy" relationship he has with "servants".
 Then there is daughter Stephanie, away from home at a Public School and thus being inculcated with upper / middle class sensibilities, who is embarrassed by both her father's differing outlook, and by the unsettled relationship between her parents.
 Finally there is his mother, who is still living in a South London terrace, and never seems impressed with his achievements, finding herself unable to understand why he lives "all the way over there" (in reality about 14 miles away) in his big house.

The third series ended with Tony looking set to enter a happy relationship with new love interest Jane Webster, a single mother from Stephanie's school, as well as romantic interests for all three staff, but also closes on a slight cliffhanger as it is displayed that Tony and Ruth still share feelings for each other. 
A fourth series was initially planned, and was mentioned in in-house BBC literature for the Autumn 1993 season on BBC One, but never came to fruition.

Cast

Regular
Dennis Waterman as Tony Carpenter, the lead character, owner of a luxury car hire business in the Surrey "Stockbroker Belt" and ardent supporter of Charlton Athletic. Although he's proud to be a "self-made man" and enjoys the good life his success has brought, Tony is unashamed of his working-class roots and treats his staff more like friends, to the frustration of his wife.
Sam Kelly as Sam Jones, a friend of Tony since their days at Clapham Parochial School. An ex-Merchant Seaman, Sam was the first driver he ever employed, and now works as chauffeur to the Carpenter family. Although Tony is his boss, Sam still behaves more like a friend towards him and isn't afraid to criticise his behaviour. Sam has feelings for Maggie but believes she prefers Tony; however, in the final episode the two get together.
Joan Sims as Mrs. Fiona Wembley, the Carpenter family's cordon bleu cook. She is something of a confidante and mother figure for the others in the house and becomes upset if Tony isn't eating properly. Fond of sherry – leading to her largely inaccurate catchphrase "just the one" – her tippling is indulged by Tony; when she fears the sack because Ruth is returning home, she confides in Sam that she worries another employer wouldn't be so understanding. Late in series one it's revealed that she never actually married Mr Wembley, as he was killed in the Korean war before they could.
Jenna Russell as Maggie Lomax, a young Scottish secretary of strong socialist leanings. She is highly efficient and regularly saves Tony's bacon when things go wrong. She and Ruth make no secret of disliking each other, something which largely stems from Ruth's (accurate) suspicion that Maggie has feelings for Tony. Maggie later gets over Tony and starts a relationship with Sam in the final episode.
Judy Buxton as Ruth Carpenter, who is described in the title song as regarding her husband as a "bit of rough". She enjoys the good life Tony's money provides but is constantly frustrated by his tendency to treat the staff as friends and his disdain for her upper class friends. She has an on-off lover, Stephen, for whom she leaves Tony more than once.
Michelle Hatch as Dawn, a lifelong friend-of-the-family and currently a Lingerie Model. Although she enjoys modelling, she is worried about being seen as a dumb blonde and, with Maggie's help, begins taking adult learning classes. She mostly sees Tony as a father figure, but in one episode attempts to seduce him.
Vanessa Hadaway as Stephanie Carpenter, Ruth and Tony Carpenter's teenage daughter, who attends a very exclusive boarding school. Although both her parents love her, she often ends up a pawn in their power games, with both trying to buy her affection with expensive gifts. Seen as spoilt by the staff, Stephanie's attitude improves somewhat when she gets some tough but genuine love from her grandmother.
Dora Bryan (series 1) then Pauline Letts (series 2 and 3) as Mrs Carpenter Senior, Tony's Mum. Proudly working class and an ardent supporter of the Labour Party, she thinks Tony has forgotten his roots. She and Ruth share a mutual dislike.
Fiona Mollison as Jane Webster (Series 2–3), from nearby Cobham, the mother of Stephanie's school friend Marina. She becomes a new love interest for Tony and is liked by his staff, with Mrs Wembley even allowing her to call her "Fiona".

Recurring
Jenny Lee as Mrs Purvis, Stephanie's headmistress
William Lucas as Sir Douglas Hoyle, Mrs Wembley's suitor
Bunny May as Barry, office manager of Tony Carpenter's car hire business
Paul Weakley as the singing gardener
John Harding as Stephen, Ruth's on-off boyfriend and a solicitor

Music
The open titles are accompanied by the 1st movement of the Handel concerti grossi Op.6 No.11 in A major – a classical instrumental piece, played by the Guildhall String Ensemble.  However, the closing credits are accompanied by Dennis Waterman's rendition of the series' custom theme tune. This continues a pattern from Minder, New Tricks and Stay Lucky, shows in which he also starred and sang the theme tune.

Reception
The series performed reasonably well, pulling in decent viewing figures and receiving generally good reaction from the public.

Release
 Series 1 - transmitted BBC1 4 September – 16 October 1990
 Series 2 - transmitted BBC1 6 September – 11 October 1991
 Series 3 - transmitted BBC1 28 September – 2 November 1992

DVD editions of the individual series, and as a Box Set, are available.

In popular culture
Mrs. Wembley's catch-phrase, "Just the One", in particular, became associated with the series and entered common British lexicon for a time.

Episodes

Series 1 (1990)

Series 2 (1991)

Series 3 (1992)

See also
Joking Apart, another sitcom about the failure of a marriage

References

External links 
 

1990 British television series debuts
1992 British television series endings
1990s British sitcoms
BBC television sitcoms
English-language television shows
Television shows set in Surrey